Princess Daisy is a fictional character in Nintendo's Mario franchise.

Princess Daisy may also refer to:

Princess Daisy (novel), a 1980 novel by Judith Krantz
Princess Daisy (miniseries), a 1983 TV miniseries based on Krantz's novel
Daisy, Princess of Pless (1873–1943), British-born socialite and German princess